

Notable missions

USA-212

Juno

Mars Science Laboratory/Curiosity

MAVEN

OSIRIS-REx

Launch statistics

Rocket configurations

Launch sites

Launch outcomes

Launch history

See also
 List of Thor and Delta launches (2010-2019)

References 

Atlas